Téhini Department is a department of Bounkani Region in Zanzan District, Ivory Coast. In 2021, its population was 83,846 and its seat is the settlement of Téhini. The sub-prefectures of the department are Gogo, Téhini, and Tougbo.

History
Téhini Department was created in 2011 as part of the restructuring of the subdivisions of Ivory Coast, when departments were converted from the second-level administrative subdivisions of the country to the third-level subdivisions. It and Doropo Department were created by splitting Bouna Department into three departments and a fourth area in Comoé National Park that is not governed by a department.

Notes

Departments of Bounkani
States and territories established in 2011
2011 establishments in Ivory Coast